The 1982 Alabama gubernatorial election was held on November 2, 1982, to elect the governor of Alabama. The incumbent, Fob James, declined to run for re-election, resulting in an open race. Former Democratic Governor George Wallace, who narrowly won the Democratic primary, defeated Republican Emory Folmar, the Mayor of Montgomery, Alabama.

In the Democratic primary, Wallace received challenges from Lieutenant Governor George McMillan, Speaker of the State House Joe McCorquodale, former Governor Jim Folsom, and Reuben McKinley. Because Wallace did not receive a majority of the votes, he advanced to a run-off with McMillan and then narrowly won the Democratic nomination. Montgomery Mayor Emory Folmar went unchallenged for the Republican nomination.

Wallace, formerly a notorious segregationist, renounced those views in 1979. On November 2, 1982, Wallace not only won the general election, but also over 90% of the black vote. Overall, Wallace received 650,538 (57.64%) votes against Folmar's 440,815 (39.06%) votes. Folmer was the last Alabama Republican gubernatorial nominee to have never won a gubernatorial general election.

Background
Incumbent Governor Fob James declined to seek a second term. Shortly after former Governor George Wallace survived an assassination attempt in 1972, he renounced his infamous segregationist past, especially when he stood in front of the school house door at the University of Alabama in 1963, noting that, "I was wrong. Those days are over, and they ought to be over." With Governor James retiring, Wallace decided to run for a fourth non-consecutive term in 1982.

Democratic primary

Incumbent Democratic Governor Fob James decided to not seek a second term.

Candidates
 Jim Folsom, former Governor
 Joe McCorquodale, Speaker of the State House of Representatives
 Reuben McKinley
 George McMillan, Lieutenant Governor
 George Wallace, former Governor

Republican primary

Emory M. Folmar won the Republican Party primary without any opposition.

Election results

 George Wallace (D) – 650,538 (57.64%)
 Emory M. Folmar (R) – 440,815 (39.06%)
 Leo Suiter (Alabama Conservative) – 17,936 (1.59%)
 Henry Klingler (Libertarian) – 7,671 (0.68%)
 John Jackson (Alabama National Democrat) – 4,693 (0.42%)
 John Dyer (Prohibition) – 4,364 (0.39%)
 Martin J. Boyers (Socialist Workers) – 2,578 (0.23%)

References
 http://www.ourcampaigns.com/RaceDetail.html?RaceID=7393

1982
Gubernatorial
Alabama
George Wallace